Victor Rivera may refer to:

 Victor Rivera (bishop) (1916–2005), American Episcopalian bishop
 Víctor Rivera (judoka) (born 1965), Puerto Rican judoka
 Victor Rivera (wrestler) (born 1944), Puerto Rican professional wrestler
 Víctor Rivera (football manager) (born 1968), Peruvian football manager
 Víctor Rivera (volleyball) (born 1976), Puerto Rican volleyball player
 Víctor Hugo Rivera (born 1967), Peruvian football referee

See also
 Víctor Rivera González (born 1948), Puerto Rican attorney and former Secretary of Corrections and Chief of Police